Danger Patrol is a 1928 American silent Western film directed by Duke Worne and starring William Russell, Virginia Brown Faire and Wheeler Oakman.

Cast
 William Russell as Sgt. John Daley 
 Virginia Brown Faire as Céleste Gambier 
 Wheeler Oakman as George Gambler 
 Rhea Mitchell as Gladys Lawlor 
 Ethan Laidlaw as 'Regina Jim' Lawlor 
 S.D. Wilcox as André

References

External links
 

1928 films
1928 Western (genre) films
Films directed by Duke Worne
1920s English-language films
American black-and-white films
Rayart Pictures films
Silent American Western (genre) films
1920s American films